Eric & Jessie: Game On is an American reality television series starring Eric Decker and Jessie James Decker. The series premiered on September 29, 2013, on E!. E! announced on June 28, 2017 the show would be returning for a third season that premiered on September 6, 2017 at 10pm.

Episodes

Series overview

Season 1 (2013)

Season 2 (2014)

Season 3 (2017)

References

External links
 

2010s American reality television series
2013 American television series debuts
English-language television shows
E! original programming
2017 American television series endings